Edessena is a genus of moths of the family Erebidae. The genus was erected by Francis Walker in 1859.

Species
Edessena gentiusalis Walker, [1859] Taiwan, Japan, China
Edessena hamada (Felder & Rogenhofer, 1874) Japan, Korea, China

References

Herminiinae